Deimberg is an Ortsgemeinde – a municipality belonging to a Verbandsgemeinde, a kind of collective municipality – in the Kusel district in Rhineland-Palatinate, Germany. It belongs to the Verbandsgemeinde Lauterecken-Wolfstein.

Geography

Location
The municipality lies on the heights west of Offenbach-Hundheim in the Western Palatinate. The village stretches over the edge of a mountain hollow at an elevation of some 380 m above sea level affording a lovely view over the northwest Palatine uplands. The Deimberger Höfchen, an outlying homestead, lies at 345 m above sea level almost 1 km northeast of the village on the Offenbach-Homberg road, Kreisstraße 63. The municipal area measures 209 ha, of which roughly 4 ha is settled and 19 ha is wooded.

Neighbouring municipalities
Deimberg borders in the north on the municipality of Herren-Sulzbach, in the east on the municipality of Buborn, in the southeast on the municipality of Offenbach-Hundheim, in the south on the municipality of Glanbrücken, in the southwest on the municipality of Sankt Julian and in the west on the municipality of Kirrweiler.

Constituent communities
Also belonging to Deimberg is the outlying homestead of Deimberger Höfchen.

History

Antiquity
The broader Deimberg area was likely settled in prehistoric and Roman times, although no archaeological finds confirming this have yet come to light in either the village or the outlying countryside.

Middle Ages
Deimberg lay in the Nahegau, but was founded relatively late, likely in the 11th or 12th century. Theoretically, there is the possibility that there had formerly been another village at this same spot called Steinbäch(e)l, even before Deimberg's founding. This has since vanished. In 1336, Deimberg had its first documentary mention in a listing of those who were liable to pay contributions to Saint Valentine’s Church (Valentinskirche) in Niedereisenbach (today a constituent community of Glanbrücken). The actual Latin text states: "Item Petrus dictus Geyst de Dimberg et Jutta sua legitima dimidiam libram cerae super agrum dictum Hezzilsbirchen" ("Petrus, called Geyst from Dimberg and his wife Jutta had to deliver half a pound of grain harvested on the field called Hezzilsbirchen"), thus mentioning the village as Dimberg. By "pound", used here to translate libram (an accusative case form; the nominative case would be libra), the reader is to understand "amount that could be weighed on a big scale", for this is apparently how the word was understood in the 14th century.

In 1350, documents mentioned a man named Heynemann Lole from Deimberg, who described himself as "Herr von Deimsberg" ("Lord of Deimsberg"). Cropping up later were the families Esch and Opp, from among whom sprang Schöffen (roughly "lay jurists") and censors. The Deimberger Hof was owned by the Waldgraves and Rhinegraves. It was for a time worked by Peter Opp and his heirs. According to writer Fabricius, the village belonged to the Gericht auf der Höhe ("Court on the Heights"), which was to be considered a subdivision within the Hochgericht auf der Heide ("High Court on the Heath"). The Gericht auf der Höhe was named when, in 1258, Castle Grumbach and its outlying lands were transferred to the Waldgraves and Rhinegraves of Dhaun. The villages within the court region, among which was Dynberg, appeared in 1363 in a document about the pledging of these lands to the County of Sponheim-Starkenburg. Then in a 1443 document, according to which the "poor people of Grumbach"were transferred to Frederick III, Count of Veldenz and Sponheim, the name Dyemberg cropped up. More precisely, the document dealt with a pledge that Rhinegrave Gottfried confirmed for Stephen, Count Palatine of Simmern-Zweibrücken, who inherited his father-in-law's territories when Frederick III died in 1444. The area of the "poor people of Grumbach", which was coterminous with the villages in the parish of Herren-Sulzbach, was redeemed by the lordship of Grumbach as early as 1477. Deimberg itself was even the object of exchanges in partitions and disputes among the various lines of the Waldgraves and Rhinegraves.

Modern times
Of the village's fate in the wars that followed, little is known. The annals from the Thirty Years' War tell of a soldier woman's child who froze to death, and of a beggar child who starved. The war and the Plague decimated the population. Deimberg, though, which was rather out of the way, seemed to come through the hardships rather better than many other villages. The local lore has it that when the Croats came through the area in 1635, Deimberg's inhabitants fled into the woods. French King Louis XIV's wars of conquest may also have brought suffering to Deimberg. Until the onset of the French Revolution, the village remained with the Rhinegraves of Grumbach.

Recent times
During the French Revolution and the Napoleonic era that followed, Deimberg belonged to the Mairie ("Mayoralty") of Grumbach within the Canton of Grumbach, the Arrondissement of Birkenfeld and the Department of Sarre. In 1816, Deimberg passed to the Principality of Lichtenberg, a newly created exclave of the Duchy of Saxe-Coburg-Saalfeld, which as of 1826 became the Duchy of Saxe-Coburg and Gotha. As part of this state, it passed in 1834 to the Kingdom of Prussia, which made this area into the Sankt Wendel district. Later, after the First World War, the Treaty of Versailles stipulated, among other things, that 26 of the Sankt Wendel district's 94 municipalities had to be ceded to the British- and French-occupied Saar. The remaining 68 municipalities then bore the designation "Restkreis St. Wendel-Baumholder", with the first syllable of Restkreis having the same meaning as in English, in the sense of "left over". Deimberg belonged to this district until 1937, when it was transferred to the Birkenfeld district. In 1969, it was transferred, this time to the Kusel district, in which it remains today. After the Second World War, the village at first lay within the Regierungsbezirk of Koblenz in the then newly founded state of Rhineland-Palatinate. In the course of administrative restructuring in Rhineland-Palatinate in 1968, the Amt of Grumbach was dissolved, and in 1972, Deimberg passed to the then newly founded Verbandsgemeinde of Lauterecken, and at the same time from the Regierungsbezirk of Koblenz to the Regierungsbezirk of Rheinhessen-Pfalz (Regierungsbezirke nowadays no longer exist in Rhineland-Palatinate).

Population development
The village has remained to this day rurally structured. In earlier days, many inhabitants were quarrymen at the sandstone quarries near the village. Back then, stonemasonry was already being practised. Other villagers earned their livelihoods as travelling musicians (Wandermusikanten). There were farmers, agricultural workers and forestry workers, but hardly any craftsmen. Even in the past, when the neighbouring villages were still extensively characterized by agriculture, most people in Deimberg had to seek work outside the village. As early as 1955 there were 47 commuters among the 56 people in the workforce. This is one reason for the fast shrinking population figures today. There are now only five long established families left in Deimberg.

The following table shows population development since Napoleonic times for Deimberg:

Municipality’s name
The village's name was witnessed only rather late, and has not cropped up very often: Dimberg in 1336, Dynberg in 1363, Dyemberg in 1443, Dymbergk about 1500, Deimberg in 1600. Today's local vernacular form, which matches the name as it appears on a 1797 map, arose through the formation of an anaptyctic vowel –i– in the root word. Thus Deimberg became Deimbrig, then Deimberich, and then Deimerich. The name's first syllable may well stem from a personal name, Dido, which would have been Didin in the genitive case. With the disappearance of the intervocalic –d– arose the syllable Dîn–, and then with assimilation to the following –b–, the –n– shifted to –m–, yielding the form Dîmberg. Therefore, the village's name is reckoned to mean "Dido’s Mountain", even if this presumably Frankish man has been lost in the mists of time.

Vanished villages
According to the writer Karsch, the village of Deimberg was always mentioned in old documents in connection with another village by the name of Steinbäch(e)l, which had supposedly already vanished by the 15th century. According to this, Deimberg-Steinbächel was a single village but with two focal points. In the oldest documents in which Deimberg is mentioned, though, the vanished village of Steinbäch(e)l is not mentioned.

Religion
Deimberg belonged to the Diocese of Mainz and lay within the parish of Herren-Sulzbach, later described as the Evangelical Parish of Herren-Sulzbach after the Waldgraves and Rhinegraves had introduced the Reformation into their domain in 1556. Until the Thirty Years' War, all the villagers were Evangelical. Later, however, other denominations were tolerated, though without gaining any special importance. The greater part of the population is even today Evangelical. In 1956, the local adherents acquired their own, small church. Formerly, they had had to attend services at the church in Herren-Sulzbach.

Politics

Municipal council
The council is made up of 6 council members, who were elected by majority vote at the municipal election held on 7 June 2009, and the honorary mayor as chairwoman.

Mayor
Deimberg's mayor is Susanne Heer, and her deputies are Martin Reidenbach and Christine Kreischer.

Coat of arms
The German blazon reads: 

The municipality's arms might in English heraldic language be described thus: Per bend sinister Or a lion rampant gules armed and langued azure and vert issuant from base a mount of three sable upon which an oaktree of the first.

The charge on the dexter (armsbearer's right, viewer's left) side, the lion, is an heraldic device formerly borne by the region's lords, the Waldgraves and Rhinegraves. The tree on the sinister (armsbearer's left, viewer's right) side is a local, protected 200-year-old oak, the Brecheiche (“Breaking Oak”, so named as it was at this tree that flax was once broken). The mount of three (Dreiberg in German) is canting for the latter syllable of the municipality's name, –berg, which means "mountain".

The arms have been borne since 20 July 1964 when they were approved by the Rhineland-Palatinate Ministry of the Interior.

Culture and sightseeing

Regular events
Deimberg holds its kermis (church consecration festival) on the second weekend in June. Most old customs have fallen by the wayside in Deimberg, and are hardly practised anymore.

Clubs
Much the same holds true for the village's clubs. The men's singing club and the gymnastic club are both long gone, but Deimberg still has a fire brigade promotional association and a sport club whose main focus is shooting sports.

Economy and infrastructure

Economic structure
The village's inhabitants earlier earned their livelihoods mainly at agriculture, but also sometimes by working the sandstone quarries nearby. From the late 19th century until the outbreak of the Second World War, many men left the village to seek their living as travelling musicians (Wandermusikanten). Over the last few decades, the number of agricultural operations has shrunk. Nevertheless, many fields are still worked now.

Transport
Deimberg can be reached over Kreisstraße (District Road) 62, which branches off the Offenbach-Langweiler through road (Kreisstraße 63) near the Deimberger Höfchen. The nearest Bundesstraßen are Bundesstraße 420 (3 km) to the southwest and Bundesstraße 270 (8 km). The nearest Autobahn interchange near Kusel is some 20 km away. Serving Lauterecken, 6 km away, is a railway station on the Lautertalbahn. Formerly there was another station only 3 km away at Offenbach on the Glantalbahn.

Education
In the Evangelical parish of Sulzbach, the clergy was already making efforts in the late 16th century, as part of the general effect of the Reformation movement, to teach children to read and write and to have them learn some practical knowledge. Christians would thereby be able to grapple with the Bible by themselves, and thus improve the general level of education. Attending school was at first voluntary. Children also at first had to attend school in Herren-Sulzbach. In 1774, the village hired its own teacher for the first time, although he only taught in the winter. The winter school (a school geared towards an agricultural community's practical needs, held in the winter, when farm families had a bit more time to spare) was, however, closed after only a few years, likely owing to cost. In the time that followed, it happened time and again that there was a schoolteacher in Deimberg, but only ever for a while, whereafter the schoolchildren would again have to go to classes in Herren-Sulzbach. Beginning in 1856, schooling for the village's children was held only in the village itself. The beadle had to call the children to classes by ringing the village bell. In 1880, the village got its own schoolhouse with a little bell, so that lessons could now be taught in a one-room school. It was 1912, however, before the teacher got his own dwelling. Schooling in Deimberg lasted until 1968, and then in the course of school reform, the village school was dissolved. The schoolhouse itself has since passed into private ownership. After the dissolution, primary school pupils first went to the Offenbach primary school and Hauptschule students to the Offenbach-Sankt Julian Hauptschule. Since then, though, primary school pupils have been attending classes at the school in Sankt Julian and the Hauptschule students have been attending classes at the school in Lauterecken.

There were formerly opportunities to take commercial classes in Offenbach and Idar-Oberstein. Young farmers could attend agricultural schools in Meisenheim and Baumholder, and after local governmental restructuring in 1968, also in Kusel. Vocational training is now handled by the vocational schools in Kusel. Gymnasien are available in Lauterecken, Meisenheim and Kusel.

References

External links

 Municipality’s official webpage 
 Deimberg in the collective municipality’s webpages 
 Brief portrait of Deimberg with film at SWR Fernsehen 

Municipalities in Rhineland-Palatinate
Kusel (district)